Signe Klinting (born April 17, 1990) is a Danish orienteering competitor and medalist from the junior world championships.

She received a silver medal in relay at the Junior World Orienteering Championships in Gothenburg in 2008, together with Ida Bobach and Maja Alm, and received an individual bronze medal in the middle distance at the 2006 championships in Druskininkai.

See also
 Danish orienteers
 List of orienteers
 List of orienteering events

References

External links

1990 births
Living people
Danish orienteers
Female orienteers
Foot orienteers
World Orienteering Championships medalists
Junior World Orienteering Championships medalists